A Google Doodle is a special, temporary alteration of the logo on Google's homepages intended to commemorate holidays, events, achievements, and notable historical figures. The first Google Doodle honored the 1998 edition of the long-running annual Burning Man event in Black Rock City, Nevada, and was designed by co-founders Larry Page and Sergey Brin to notify users of their absence in case the servers crashed. Early Marketing employee Susan Wojcicki then spearheaded subsequent Doodles, including an alien landing on Google and additional custom logos for major holidays. Google Doodles were designed by an outside contractor until 2000, when Page and Brin asked public relations officer Dennis Hwang to design a logo for Bastille Day. Since then, a team of employees called "Doodlers" have organized and published the Doodles.

Initially, Doodles were neither animated nor hyperlinked—they were simply images with tooltips describing the subject or expressing a holiday greeting. Doodles increased in both frequency and complexity by the beginning of the 2010s. In January 2010 the first animated Doodle honored Sir Isaac Newton. The first interactive Doodle appeared shortly thereafter celebrating Pac-Man, and hyperlinks also began to be added to Doodles, usually linking to a search results page for the subject of the Doodle. By 2014, Google had published over 2,000 regional and international Doodles throughout its homepages, often featuring guest artists, musicians, and personalities. By 2019, the "Doodlers" team had created over 4,000 doodles for Google's homepages around the world.

Overview
In addition to celebrating many well-known events and holidays, Google Doodles celebrate artists and scientists on their birthdays. The featuring of Lowell's logo design coincided with the launch of another Google product, Google Maps. Google Doodles are also used to depict major events at Google, such as the company's own anniversary. The celebration of historic events is another common topic of Google Doodles including a Lego brick design in celebration of the interlocking Lego block's 50th anniversary. Some Google Doodles are limited to Google's country-specific home pages while others appear globally.

Common themes
Since Google first celebrated the Thanksgiving holiday with a Doodle in 1998, many Doodles for holidays, events and other celebrations have recurred on an annual basis, including the following:
 Gregorian New Year (2000–present)
 Martin Luther King Jr. Day (2003; 2006–present)
 Lunar New Year (2001; 2003–present)
 Valentine's Day (2000–present; partial exception during certain Olympic years)
 International Women's Day (2005; 2009–present)
 Saint Patrick's Day (2000–2021; 2023–present)
 Earth Day (2001–present)
 Mother's Day (2000–present)
 Father's Day (2000–present)
 Juneteenth (2020–present)
 U.S. Independence Day (2000–present)
 Bastille Day (2000–present)
 German Unity Day (2002–2003; 2006–2008; 2010–present)
 Swiss National Day (2001–2015; 2016–present)
 Olympic Games (2000–present; partial exception in 2014)
 Holi (2001–present; intermittently)
 Halloween (1999–present)
 Hinamatsuri (2009–2012; 2014–present)
 International Men's Day (2022–present)
 U.S. Thanksgiving Day (1998–present)
 Christmas Day (1999–present)
 New Year's Eve (2011–present)

Doodlers
The illustrators, engineers, and artists who design Google Doodles are called "Doodlers". These doodlers have included artists like Ekua Holmes, Jennifer Hom, Sophia Foster-Dimino, Ranganath Krishnamani, Dennis Hwang, Olivia Fields, and Eric Carle.

Interactive and notable doodles

In May 2010, on the 30th anniversary of the 1980 arcade game Pac-Man, Google unveiled worldwide their first interactive logo, created in association with Namco. Anyone who visited Google could play Pac-Man on the logo, which featured the letters of the word "Google" on the Pac-Man maze. The logo also mimicked the sounds the original arcade game made. The "I'm Feeling Lucky" button was replaced with an "Insert Coin" button. Pressing this once enabled the user to play the Pac-Man logo. Pressing it once more added a second player, Ms. Pac-Man, enabling two players to play at once, controlled using the W, A, S, D keys, instead of the arrows as used by Player 1. Pressing it for a third time performed an "I'm Feeling Lucky" search. It was then removed on May 23, 2010, initially replacing Pac-Man with the normal logo. Later on that day, Google released a permanent site to play Google Pac-Man (accessed by clicking on top icon), due to the popular user demand for the playable logo. Pac-Man Doodle drew an estimated 1billion players worldwide.

Since that time, Google has continued to post occasional interactive and video doodles:

2010s
On June 8, 2010, Robert Schumann was celebrated with a Google Doodle for his 200th birthday.
 On September 4, 2010, the Google logo was changed to an interactive Buckyball to celebrate the 25th anniversary of its discovery. The Buckyball, also known as the Buckminsterfullerene C60 is a molecule made entirely of carbon.
On September 6, 2010, Google launched its fourth interactive Google Doodle. "Google Instant - Particle Logo" replaced its static logo with a JavaScript-based particle movement simulator where dynamic colored balls can be manipulated with the movement of the mouse cursor over the logo, or by shaking of the browser window. Unlike some other Google Doodles, this one is unclickable.
On September 7, 2010, another Google Instant family logo known as "Keystroke Logo" was released. Greyed-out colorless logo lit up with the standard Google colors as the first 6 letters of a search query were entered.
On October 8, 2010, Google ran its first video doodle, a short animation set to the music of "Imagine" to mark what would have been John Lennon's 70th birthday. Similarly, Freddie Mercury's would-be 65th birthday was celebrated on September 5, 2011, with an animated clip set to "Don't Stop Me Now".
On April 15, 2011, Google sported the first live-action video doodle, commemorating what would have been Charlie Chaplin's 122nd birthday. This doodle was a black and white YouTube video that, when clicked upon, started playing before redirecting to the usual Google search featuring the doodle's special occasion. All parts in this short film were played by the Google Doodle team, and special behind-the-scenes footage was to be found on the Google blog.
Google displayed an interactive electric guitar doodle starting June 9, 2011, to celebrate the would-be 96th birthday of Les Paul. Apart from being able to hover the cursor over the doodle to strum the strings just like one of Les Paul's Gibson guitars, there was also a keyboard button, which when enabled allowed interaction with the doodle via the keyboard. The doodle still maintained some resemblance to the Google logo. In the U.S, the doodle also allowed the user to record a 30-second clip, after which a URL is created and can be sent to others. The doodle remained on the site an extra day due to popularity in the U.S. It now has its own page linked to the Google Doodles archives.
On January 18, 2012, for users in the United States, Google placed a censor bar on top of their logo to protest SOPA and PIPA.
On May 23, 2012, for what would have been instrument inventor and synthesizer pioneer Robert Moog's 78th birthday, the Doodle team pulled off their own feat of engineering: a fully playable and recordable Google logo resembling a vintage Minimoog Model D synthesizer. Electronic analog Moog Synthesizer timbre and tones would come to define a generation of music, featuring heavily in songs by The Beatles, The Doors, Stevie Wonder, Kraftwerk and many others. Much like the musical machines Bob Moog created, this doodle was synthesized from a number of smaller components to form a unique instrument. Mouse or computer keyboard was used to control the mini-synthesizer's keys and knobs and fiddle with oscillators and envelopes. Synthesizer doodle patched the keyboard into a 4-track tape recorder that could share songs.
On June 23, 2012, in commemoration of what would have been Alan Turing's 100th birthday, Google's logo became an interactive Turing Machine.
On August 8, 2012, Google Displayed an interactive Basketball Game for the 2012 Summer Olympics.
On September 13, 2012, Google created a doodle for Clara Schumann to celebrate her 193rd birthday.
On November 23, 2013, Google's logo changed to a playable Doctor Who game in honor of the show's 50th anniversary.
On May 19, 2014, for the 40th anniversary of the Rubik's Cube, Google made an interactive virtual Rubik's Cube that people could try to solve.
On April 14, 2015, for the 155th anniversary of the Pony Express, Google made a playable 2D side-scrolling doodle game in which the player collects mail, avoids obstacles, and delivers up to 100 letters from California to Missouri.
On December 17, 2015, a Google Doodle was featured honoring the 245th anniversary of Beethoven's baptism. It features an interactive game to match the musical writing in correct order as it featured 4 levels.
On January 22, 2016, for the 151st birthday of Wilbur Scoville, creator of the Scoville Scale, Google made a playable doodle game in which the player plays as an ice cream cone throwing ice cream scoops at a variety of peppers to neutralize their heat. Gameplay is based on the timing of a mouse click or space bar press which rapidly increases in difficulty. The game features 5 levels, each featuring a different type of pepper (Bell Pepper, Jalapeño Pepper, Cayenne Pepper, Ghost Pepper, and Trinidad Moruga scorpion) and a fun fact about each pepper along with its measured Scoville Heat Units.
On August 5, 2016, for the 2016 Summer Olympics, the Google app received an update for Android and iOS devices to include 7 mini games called "Doodle Fruit Games" featuring Strawberry, Blueberry, Coconut, Pineapple, and more. It lasted until August 21, with a new mini game every day. The game was accessible on the Google app by clicking on a play button.
On October 30, 2016, for Halloween, Google added a game called Magic Cat Academy, featuring a cat named Momo fighting ghosts. To play, users had to click on a play button, and users have to "draw" to kill the ghosts.
On February 11, 12, 13 and 14, 2017, for Valentine's Day, Google added a game featuring the endangered pangolin, an African and Asian mammal, that goes through four levels (one released each day), while collecting objects, and avoiding obstacles.
On 28 February 2017, Google celebrated Edhi with a Google Doodle hailing his "super-efficient" ambulance service.
On May 9, 2017, a Google Doodle was featured honoring the 181st birthday of Ferdinand Monoyer. He was a French ophthalmologist, who introduced the dioptre in 1872. Dioptre is the unit of measurement of the focusing power of the lens. It is like the distance between a person's eyes and the text to be read. Monoyer devised an eye chart where every row represents a different diopter, from smallest to largest. A close look at Doodle may reveal to the reader a tribute to Ferdinand Monoyer: his name, hidden in the chart.
On June 22, 2017, to celebrate what would have been the 117th birthday of Oskar Fischinger, a musician, Google released an interactive fullscreen Doodle that let users create their own musical songs by tapping on the screen. The user could then choose to share it to social media. The game was accessible by tapping on 2 play buttons.
On August 11, 2017, the 44th anniversary of DJ Kool Herc's pioneering use of the hip hop break, the Google Doodle allowed users use a double turntable to act as a hip-hop DJ.
On September 4, 2017, to celebrate what would have been the 83rd birthday of Russian baritone singer Eduard Khil, Google added a video doodle that featured an animated Eduard Khil singing "I am very glad, as I'm finally returning back home", known globally as the "Trololo" song.
On December 4, 2017, Google celebrated 50 years of kids' coding languages with an Interactive Doodle.
On January 29, 2018, Google celebrated Taiwanese singer Teresa Teng on what would have been her 65th birthday.
On May 3, 2018, Google celebrated the work of Georges Méliès by making a doodle that encompassed his famous work such as A Trip to the Moon and The Impossible Voyage. The doodle is also the first google doodle that was shown in 360-degrees format, with the viewer being able to rotate the video to give them different points of view.
On June 10, 2018, Google celebrated the history of garden gnomes by releasing an interactive Doodle where the player can use a catapult to launch their clay gnomes into the farthest reach of their garden.
On 15 September 2018, for India, Sir Mokshagundam Visvesvaraya’s 158th Birthday. On whose birthday India celebrates Engineer's day.
On October 30, 2018, for Halloween, Google added a multiplayer game called Great Ghoul Duel, featuring two teams of ghosts racing to collect spirits and steal them from the other team. Games can support up to 8 players, and users could create custom invite links or match with random users across the globe. Great Ghoul Duel was the first Doodle to support multiplayer over the internet.
On November 6, 2018, for the United States elections, Google changed their logo to "Go Vote."
On March 21, 2019, Google celebrated German composer and musician Johann Sebastian Bach by creating the first Doodle that uses artificial intelligence to make music. When a button is pressed, the Doodle uses machine learning to harmonize a user-created melody into Bach's signature music style (or alternatively into a Bach 80s rock style hybrid if an amp on the right side is clicked).
On July 16–20, 2019, Google celebrated the 50th anniversary of the Apollo 11 Moon landing by NASA where Neil Armstrong became the first man on the Moon.
On 12 August 2019, for India, Google commemorated Vikram Sarabhai's 100th birth anniversary. He is internationally regarded as the Father of the Indian Space Program.

2020s
On March 20, 2020, in the midst of the COVID-19 pandemic, Google honored Ignaz Semmelweis for pioneering the practice of hand washing. The Doodle animation specifically showcased how to properly and thoroughly wash one's hands.
Google also released several doodles in the following weeks thanking various industry workers who helped people out during the pandemic.
Some games were re-released for people staying at home during lockdown to play.
On April 22, 2020, in celebration of the 50th anniversary of Earth Day, a Doodle game was created in partnership with the Honeybee Conservancy, wherein a honeybee is guided by the player to pollinate flowers, while facts about the honeybee and its impact are shared between levels.
On June 30, 2020, Google celebrated Marsha P. Johnson with a Google Doodle.
On September 1, 2020, Google honored Jackie Ormes, known for being the first African-American woman cartoonist, along with being the creator of the Torchy Brown comic strip and the Patty-Jo 'n' Ginger panel. The Doodle animation showcased a slideshow of her career.
On Halloween, a sequel to the 2016 Halloween Doodle was made. It had similar gameplay, but a different setting (underwater) and focused on sea creatures such as the immortal jellyfish and the anglerfish.
On January 15, 2021, Google honored James Naismith, known as the inventor of the game of basketball.  The Doodle animation showcases a person making a basket.
On March 10, 2021, Google honored Wu Lien-teh, depicting Wu Lien-teh assembling surgical masks and distributing them to reduce the risk of disease transmission.
On June 9, 2021, Google honored Shirley Temple with an animated depiction of her during her career as a child actress alongside her later service as a diplomat.
On July 23, 2021, Google released an RPG-style game called Doodle Champion Island Games, with artwork by Studio 4°C, to celebrate video gaming, Japanese folklore, and the 2020 Olympics in Tokyo.
On August 14, 2021, Google made a doodle of Derawar Fort to celebrate Pakistan's 75 Independence Day. According to Google, the fort symbolizes Pakistani adaptability and antiquity.
On September 2, 2021, Google made a doodle celebrating the 138th birthday of the Polish biologist Rudolf Weigl, known for inventing the epidemic typhus vaccine.
On September 5, 2021, Olivia When made a doodle celebrating the 107th birthday of the Chilean poet Nicanor Parra, being visible in 15 countries, including Chile.
On September 6, 2021, Google made a doodle celebrating the 100th birthday of the Spanish writer Carmen Laforet, in which she appears reading a book on a balcony.
On September 8, 2021, Google made an 80-second illustrated video celebrating the 32nd birthday of Tim Bergling, in which a lot of people appear enjoying the song "Wake Me Up" by the Swedish DJ.
On September 15, 2021, Google made five doodles celebrating independence day in various Central American countries such as Guatemala, Honduras, El Salvador, Nicaragua and Costa Rica, Panama was not included, because its independence date was not September 15.
On September 16, 2021, Magdiel Herrera made a doodle known as "a la mexicana" celebrating the Mexican independence day, in it shows a china poblana, a pozole, a bell, a hat with a zarape, a cactus and an Aztec musician.
On September 17, 2021, Google did a doodle celebrating the birth of Michiyo Tsujimura, a Japanese biochemist known for her research on green tea and its nutritional benefits.
On September 18, 2021, Google made a doodle from the Chilean National Holidays shows in the center to a huemul, an animal representative of both the country and the national shield.
In January 2022, Google created a special Doodle that shows up when one searches on "Wordle", based on the online game Wordle that had risen to popularity in the prior month. The Doodle mimics one playing the game of Wordle on the name "Google".
On January 17, 2022, Google celebrated what would have been Betty White's 100th birthday (she died just weeks earlier on December 31, 2021) by having rose petals fall from the top of the screen and the phrase "thank you for being a friend" appear at the bottom when the user searches for her name, both references to her popular television role on The Golden Girls.
On February 17, 2022, Google celebrated Dr. Michiaki Takahashi's 94th birthday with a doodle showing first the research phase, then a boy with chickenpox, a doctor giving the chickenpox vaccine, and ending with bottles of medicine and dots giving a graphical representation of the declining number of cases due to the vaccine.
On September 8, 2022, the date of Queen Elizabeth II's death, Google erected a specialized grayscale Doodle in the United Kingdom and certain other Commonwealth nations, which comprised simply the Google logo without color and a hyperlink to "Queen Elizabeth II" in honor of the late monarch. A dedicated page was erected for the Doodle on Google's Doodle archive site, but it was not displayed in the normal listing.
For the date of Queen Elizabeth II's funeral, September 19, Google changed the aforementioned grayscale Doodle to black. This Doodle, as with the grayscale one erected on her date of death, was also not displayed in the normal archive listing on Google's Doodle archive site.
On October 30–31, 2022, Google re-released the Great Ghoul Duel multiplayer Doodle from 2018 with additional maps and achievements. The game was originally scheduled to be released 2021 but it was delayed due to server and designing difficulties.

"Doodle 4 Google" competitions

Google holds competitions for school students to create their own Google doodles, referred to as "Doodle 4 Google".  Winning doodles go onto the Doodle4Google website, where the public can vote for the winner, who wins a trip to the Googleplex and the hosting of the winning doodle for 24 hours on the Google website.

The competition originated in the United Kingdom, and has since expanded to the United States and other countries. The competition was also held in Ireland in 2008. Google announced a Doodle 4 Google competition for India in 2009 and the winning doodle was displayed on the Google India homepage on November 14. A similar competition held in Singapore based on the theme "Our Singapore" was launched in January 2010 and the winning entry was chosen from over 30,000 entries received. The winning design was shown on Singapore's National Day on Google Singapore's homepage. It was held again in 2015 in Singapore and was themed 'Singapore: The next 50 years'.

Controversy and criticism

On September 13, 2007, Google posted a doodle honoring author Roald Dahl on the anniversary of his birth. This date also happened to coincide with the first day of the Jewish holiday of Rosh Hashanah, and Google was immediately criticized by some groups for this decision due to the fact that Dahl has been accused of anti-Semitism. Google removed the Doodle by 2:00 p.m. that day, and there remains no evidence of its existence in Google's official Doodle archive to this date.

In 2007, Google was also criticized for not featuring versions of the Google logo for American patriotic holidays such as Memorial Day and Veterans Day. Google featured a logo commemorating Veterans Day that year.

In 2014, Google received some criticism for failing to honor the 70th anniversary of the D-Day invasion with a Doodle and instead honoring Japanese Go player Honinbo Shusaku. In response to the criticism, Google removed the logo from their homepage and added a series of links to images of the invasion of Normandy.

On May 19, 2016, Google honored Yuri Kochiyama, an Asian American activist and member of the Maoist-based black nationalist group Revolutionary Action Movement, with a Doodle on its main U.S. homepage. This choice was criticized by conservative commentators due to some of Kochiyama's controversial opinions, such as an admiration for Osama bin Laden and Mao Zedong. U.S. Senator Pat Toomey called for a public apology from Google. Google did not respond to any criticism, nor did it alter the presentation of the Doodle on its homepage or on the Doodle's dedicated page.

Gender 
In 2014, a report published by SPARK Movement, an activist organization, stated that there was a large gender and race imbalance in the number of Doodles shown by Google, and that most Doodles were honoring white males. The report was widely reported in the media, and Google made a commitment to increase the proportion of women and racial minorities.

Religious holidays
Google typically abstains from referencing or celebrating religious holidays specifically in Doodles, or in cases when they do, religious themes and iconography are avoided. Google has acknowledged this as an official policy, stating in April 2018 that they "don't have Doodles for religious holidays", according to "current Doodle guidelines." Google further explained that Doodles may appear for some "non-religious celebrations that have grown out of religious holidays", citing Valentine's Day (Christianity), Holi (Hinduism), and Tu B'Av (Judaism) as examples, but that the company does not include "religious imagery or symbolism" as part of those Doodles.

Google has been criticized for what has been perceived as its inconsistency regarding the implementation of its religious holiday policy, notably its lack of Doodles for major Christian holidays. Critics have pointed to its yearly recognition of the Jewish and Hindu festivals of Tu B'av and Holi, while Easter only received an official Doodle once in 2000 (and a themed homepage in 2019). Christmas is not specifically celebrated by name, although a Doodle with a seasonally festive and/or winter theme has always been present on December 25 since 1999. Since the mid-2010s, Google has also repeated their December 25 doodle on January 7, which is the date for Christmas in the Eastern Orthodox Church, but the word "Christmas" has never explicitly been used; the terminology "holidays" and "Eastern Europe" are used instead of "Christmas" or "Eastern Orthodox Church".

Easter
Google first created a Doodle for Easter in 2000, and did not acknowledge the holiday on its homepage again until 2019. In March 2013, Google was criticized for celebrating American activist Cesar Chavez on Easter Sunday with a Doodle instead of Easter.

In 2019, after an 18-year hiatus, Google presented an atypical "Doodle" for Easter, for the desktop version of their homepage only. Unlike what is seen in virtually all other Doodles, the Google logo itself was unaltered in the presentation of the Doodle, and users had to click on the "I'm Feeling Lucky" button where "Lucky" is replaced with an anthropomorphic Easter egg, which triggered a falling array of Easter-themed items such as eggs, bunnies, and hot cross buns. Some of these items were hyperlinked, leading to a detailed page about Easter customs. Google's official Doodle archive page originally contained an unlisted entry for the 2019 Easter Doodle, which has since been removed. Notably, the 2019 Easter-themed homepage was not visible from mobile devices unless the "Desktop mode" option was triggered on the mobile browser, leading to the majority of users not ever seeing the "Doodle". Danny Sullivan, technologist with Google involved with the Easter-themed homepage, responded to an inquiry about its absence on mobile by saying it was "hard to do the interactivity dependably [on mobile]".

In 2020, Google once again celebrated Easter atypically on its homepage, but not as a Doodle. An Easter egg was placed below the "Google Search" and "I'm Feeling Lucky" buttons, with hovertext indicating "Happy Easter". When clicked, the egg led to a search results page for "Easter". This is similar to how Memorial Day and Remembrance Day have been recognized by the company in the US.

See also

Brand management
Interactive media
Magic Cat Academy
Doodle Champion Island Games

Notes

References

External links

Doodle
Articles containing video clips
Computer-related introductions in 1998
Commercial logos